Mykhailo Bolotskykh (born 28 October 1960) is a Ukrainian politician and military serviceman, Colonel General (Civil Defense Service). In spring of 2014 he was a governor of Luhansk Oblast.

Personal life 
Mykhailo Bolotskykh was born on 28 October 1960 in Stary Oskol, Belgorod Oblast. He graduated from the Kharkiv Armor Commanding College in 1982 and Combat Engineer Institute of the Podillia State Agro-Technical University in 2001.

In 1994–95 took part in peacekeeping missions for Ukraine in Yugoslavia as part of the 240th Separate Special Battalion.

In 2010–12 he was the first deputy of Minister of Emergencies and during some period served as the acting minister in 2010. In 2012–14 Bolotskykh headed the newly reformed State Emergency Service of Ukraine as part of the Ministry of Defense.

See also
 Aleksandr Kharitonov (politician)

References

External links 
 Biography at the State Service of Ukraine in Emergencies
 Bolotskykh at the ord-02.com
 Bolotskykh at the dovidka.com.ua

1960 births
Living people
People from Stary Oskol
Russian emigrants to Ukraine
Governors of Luhansk Oblast
Colonel Generals of Ukraine
National Academy of State Administration alumni
Emergency ministers of Ukraine